Laçin District is a district of the Çorum Province of Turkey. Its seat is the town of Laçin. Its area is 196 km2, and its population is 4,211 (2022).

Composition
There is one municipality in Laçin District:
 Laçin

There are 14 villages in Laçin District:

 Çamlıca
 Çamlıpınar
 Doğanlar
 Gökçekaya
 Gökgözler
 Gözübüyük
 İkizce
 Karasoku
 Kavaklıçiftlik
 Kuyumcu
 Mescitli
 Narlı
 Sıtma
 Yeşilpınar

References

Districts of Çorum Province